Senijeh (also Romanized as Senījeh; also known as Sanīcheh and Sīncheh) is a village in Mollasani Rural District, in the Central District of Bavi County, Khuzestan Province, Iran. At the 2006 census, its population was 222, in 31 families.

References 

Populated places in Bavi County